Scythocentropus inquinata is a moth of the family Noctuidae. It was described by Jules Paul Mabille in 1888. It is found in Tunisia and Egypt, as well as on the Canary Islands and Malta.

References

  Retrieved April 23, 2018.

Moths described in 1888
Owlet moths of Africa
Moths of Africa
Moths of the Middle East